Elk Lake Water Aerodrome  is located on Elk Lake, Ontario, Canada.

See also
Elk Lake Airport

References

Registered aerodromes in Timiskaming District
Seaplane bases in Ontario